Annika-Marie Fuchs (born 29 April 1997) is a German athlete specialising in the javelin throw. She represented her country at the 2019 World Championships without qualifying for the final. In addition, she won a gold medal at the 2019 European U23 Championships in Gävle.

Her personal best in the event is 63.68 metres set in Gävle in 2019.

In 2019, she won the bronze medal in the team event at the 2019 European Games held in Minsk, Belarus.

International competitions

References

German female javelin throwers
1997 births
Living people
World Athletics Championships athletes for Germany
Sportspeople from Cottbus
Athletes (track and field) at the 2019 European Games
European Games medalists in athletics
European Games bronze medalists for Germany